High Sierra may refer to:

Places
 High Sierra (biome), a region of California 
 Sierra Nevada (U.S.), a mountain range in California also called the High Sierra or High Sierras
 High Sierra Trail, which crosses the Sierra Nevada

Arts, entertainment, and media
 High Sierra (film), 1941
 High Sierra Music Festival, held in Quincy, California since 1991
 John Muir's High Sierra, an Oscar-nominated short documentary

Computing and technology
 High Sierra Format, a CD-ROM filesystem developed in 1986
 macOS High Sierra, an operating system for Apple computers

Other uses
 High Sierra, an outdoor brand sold by luggage manufacturer Samsonite International

See also
 Sierra mountains (disambiguation)